Jakob Johansson (born January 3, 1979) is a Swedish professional ice hockey player presently with the Rögle BK team in the Swedish Elitserien league.

References

External links 

1979 births
Swedish ice hockey centres
Rögle BK players
Brynäs IF players
Living people